

References

Lists of horror films by year
2007-related lists